The Dresden Dolls is the debut studio album by American dark cabaret duo The Dresden Dolls. It was recorded by Brooklyn producer Martin Bisi and released on September 26, 2003 on 8 ft. Records, the band's personal label. Upon signing with Roadrunner Records, the album was re-released on April 27, 2004. The enhanced CD included a video for "Girl Anachronism". The album artwork was also modified to mask which record sleeves had been used in the album artwork.

This is Amanda Palmer's highest-selling album, a 2004 re-release, has sold 149,000 copies; none of her subsequent albums (two more Dresden Dolls records, a solo release and an album by a project called Evelyn Evelyn) crossed the 100,000 mark, according to Nielsen SoundScan.

The Dresden Dolls Companion 

In The Dresden Dolls Companion, Amanda Palmer has published a history of this album and of the duo, as well as a partial autobiography. The book also contains the lyrics, sheet music, and notes on each song in the album, as well as a DVD with a 20-minute interview with Amanda. In the interview, Amanda discusses the making of the album and the artwork while working on the artwork in her apartment.

Track listing

Personnel 

 The Dresden Dolls
 Amanda Palmer – piano, toy piano, vocals, lyricist, composer, songwriter
 Brian Viglione – drums, guitar, backing vocals

 Additional personnel
 Ad Frank – electric guitar, backing vocals
 Shawn Setaro – bass guitar, acoustic guitar
 Sasha Forte – violin, viola
 Johnathan Sacks – cello
 Martin Bisi –  Memory Man

References 

2003 debut albums
The Dresden Dolls albums
Albums produced by Martin Bisi
Roadrunner Records albums